Taračin Do is a village in the municipality of Ilijaš, Bosnia and Herzegovina.

Taračin Do is 15 kilometers north of Sarajevo, and it is easiest to reach it through Solakovići, a five-kilometer-long local road that separates on the 22nd kilometer of the main road (M-18) Sarajevo-Tuzla, Ljubini. It is now only a geographic name for a desolate place that is no longer inhabited. Over a century, Taračin Do was a geographic, spiritual, educational-cultural and administrative-administrative center of the wider area, consisting of about twenty villages between Semizovac and Srednje, in the Ljubina and Misoča river basins.

Demographics 
According to the 2013 census, its population was nil, down from 83 in 1991.

References

Populated places in Ilijaš